The 1990 FIBA World Championship for Women was held in Malaysia. The list includes the twelve-women rosters of the sixteen participating countries, totaling 172 players.

Group A

Australia

Jenny Reisener
Joanne Moyle
Karen Dalton
Lucille Hamilton
Marina Moffa
Michele Timms
Rachael Sporn
Robyn Maher
Samantha Thornton
Sandy Brondello
Shelley Gorman
Tracey Browning
Head coach:Robert Cadee

Bulgaria

Evladia Slavcheva
Kostadinka Radkova
Krassimira Bannova
Larissa Sachova
Lidia Varbanova
Madlena Staneva
Mariana Naidenova
Mariana Tchobanova
Nina Hadjijankova
Polina Tzekova
Sonia Dragomirova
Vania Popova
Head coach:Ivan Lepichev

Italy

Anna Costalunga
Catarina Pollini
Cinzia Bianco
Cinzia Zanotti
Cristina Rivellini
Laura Gori
Mara Fullin
Marisa Comelli
Renata Salvestrini
Silvia Todeschini
Stefania Passaro
Stefania Stanzani
Head coach:Aldo Corno

Malaysia

Chu Tan Poh
Eng Lim Hoon
Fong Chin Kim
Hung Lee Hai
Keng Wan Geok
Leng See Peck
Maggie Teo
May Lew Foo
Nee Chew Kun
Shan Neo Sheau
Sim Ooi Ping
Young Tan Kim
Head coach:Wang Deli

Group B

Brazil

Ana Lúcia Mota
Ana Paula Monteiro
Hortência Marcari
Janeth Arcain
Joycemara Batista
Maria Paula Silva
Nádia Lima
Roseli Gustavo
Ruth de Souza
Simone Pontello
Vânia Teixeira
Yngrid Cabral
Head coach:Maria Helena Cardoso

Canada

Andrea Blackwell
Anna Stammberger
Carol Goodale
Chantal St. Martin
Cori Blackrough
Janet Fowler
Jodi Evans
Karla Karch
Kim Bertholet
Lori Clarke
Merelynn Lange
Michelle Henry
Head coach:Wayne Hussey

Japan

Aki Ichijo
Hiroe Kikizaki
Hiroko Tanabe
Kagari Yamada
Kikuko Mikawa
Kyomi Sumi
Mariko Muramatsu
Mayumi Kuroda
Mikiko Hagiwara
Norie Suzuki
Takako Katō
Takami Takeuchi
Head coach:Fumikazu Nakagawa

Soviet Union

Elen Bounatiants
Elena Chvaibovitch
Elena Khoudachova
Elena Mozgovaia
Galina Savistskaia
Irina Chevtchouk
Irina Minkh
Irina Soumnikova
Marina Tkachenko
Natalia Zassoulskaia
Olga Ekova
Svetlana Kuznetsova
Head coach:Evgueni Gomelski

Group C

Czechoslovakia

Andrea Chupikova
Anna Janostinova
Erika Dobrovicova
Eva Kaluzakova
Eva Krizova
Eva Nemcova
Irma Valova
Renata Hirakova
Vaclava Simonova
Yveta Bielikova
Zora Brziakova
Zuzana Vasilkova
Head coach:Miroslav Vondricka

Senegal

Adama Diakhaté
Adama Diop
Anemarie Dioh
Astou Ndiaye-Diatta
Douty Ndoye
Khady Diop
Mame Maty Mbengue
Martana Kayara
Marthe Ndiaye
Nathalie Sagna
Ramatoulaye Diakhate
Tegaye Niang
Head coach:Ibrahima Diagne

South Korea

Lim Ae-Kueong
Chun Eun-Sook
Chung Eun-Soon
Lee Hyung-Suk
Seong Jeong-A
Yoo Jeong-Ae
Lee Kang-Hee
Seo Kyong-Hwa
Choi Kyung-Hee
Jeong Mi-Kyeong
Cho Mun-Ju
Ha Sook-Rye
Head coach:Chung Joo-Hyun

United States

Carolyn Jones-Young
Cynthia Cooper
Jennifer Azzi
Katrina McClain
Lynette Woodard
Medina Dixon
Sonja Henning
Tammy Jackson
Teresa Edwards
Vicki Hall
Vickie Orr
Vicky Bullett
Head coach:Theresa Grentz

Group D

PR China

Xu Chunmei
Li Dongmei
Wang Fang
Ling Guang
Chu Hui
Peng Ping
Liu Qing
Zheng Wei
Li Xin
Xue Cuilan
Hu Yun
Zheng Xiulin
Head coaches:Lu ChangxinWang Zangxing

Cuba

Ana Hernández
Beatriz Perdomo
Dalia Henry
Gestrudis Gomez
Yudith Águila
Andrea Borrell
Liset Castillo
María León
Odalys Cala
Olga Vigil
Regla Hernandez
Yamilet Martinez
Head coaches:Tomas MartínezManuel Pérez

Yugoslavia

Anđelija Arbutina
Bojana Milošević
Danijela Ilić
Danira Nakić
Eleonora Wild
Kornelija Kvesić
Mara Lakić
Nina Bjedov
Razija Mujanović
Slađana Golić
Tima Džebo
Vesna Bajkuša
Head coaches:Mihajlo VukovićMiodrag Vesković

Zaire

Ana Kano
Iyoko Lingenga
Kasala Kamanga
Lomboto Bofonda
Lomboto Bompoko
Mboli Alele
Mukendi Mbuyi
Mwabilayi Ntumba
Ndombasi Nsimbweni
Nsunda Ngoyi
Obudu Okako
Osudu Okako
Head coaches:Ngenda LomaniAbongo Malu

References
Rosters

squads
FIBA Women's Basketball World Cup squads